Mayo House may refer to:

Mayo House (Marvell, Arkansas), listed on the U.S. National Register of Historic Places
Helton-Mayo Farm, Bedford, Indiana, listed on the NRHP in Lawrence County, Indiana
Mayo Mansion, also known as John C.C. Mayo Mansion and Office, Paintsville, Kentucky, listed on the NRHP in Johnson County, Kentucky
Mayo Mansion (Ashland, Kentucky), listed on the NRHP in Boyd County, Kentucky as part of the Bath Avenue Historic District
Thomas Mayo House, Paintsville, Kentucky, listed on the NRHP in Johnson County, Kentucky
Moore-Mayo House, Bass Harbor, Maine, listed on the NRHP in Hancock County, Maine
Mayo House (Portland, Oregon)
Dr. William J. Mayo House, Rochester, Minnesota, NRHP-listed
Dr. William W. Mayo House, Le Sueur, Minnesota, NRHP-listed
Taylor-Mayo House, Richmond, Virginia, listed on the NRHP in Richmond, Virginia

See also
Mayo Building (disambiguation)
Mayo Hotel, Tulsa, Oklahoma, NRHP-listed

Architectural disambiguation pages